The Caoqiao Mosque or Grass Bridge Mosque is a mosque in Qinhuai District, Nanjing City, Jiangsu Province, China.

History
The mosque was originally constructed during the Qianlong Emperor rule of Qing Dynasty. Since then, the mosque has been reconstructed and removed several times.

Architecture
The mosque was built with traditional Chinese architecture style. It consists of main prayer hall, teaching room, ablution room and wing room.

Activities
The mosque houses the headquarters of Chinese Hui Religion Association which was established in 1912.

Transportation
The mosque is accessible within walking distance west of Zhangfuyuan Station of Nanjing Metro.

See also
 Islam in China
 List of mosques in China

References

Mosques in Nanjing